The LNFA 1995 was the first season of the new American football league in Spain. It was the result of the merger between two previous leagues.

18 teams were divided in two conferences. The Conferencia Nacional (National Conference), with the teams from the defunct American Football League, and the Conferencia Española (Spanish Conference), formed by the teams from the Catalan league.

Regular season

National conference

Spanish Conference

Playoffs

References

External links
FEFA American Football Spanish Federation
Results and information of Spanish leagues

Liga Nacional de Fútbol Americano
1995 in Spanish sport
1995 in American football